Pascal Lino (born 13 August 1966) is a French former road racing cyclist. Lino turned professional in 1988, and is most famous for being the wearer of the yellow jersey of the 1992 Tour de France for 11 days. He represented his native country at the 1988 Summer Olympics in the Men's Points Race.

Career achievements

Major results

1986
 2nd Duo Normand
1987
 2nd Overall Ruban Granitier Breton
 10th Overall Tour Méditerranéen
1988
 1st Prologue Tour of Greece
1989
 1st  Overall Tour de la Communauté Européenne
 8th Grand Prix de la Libération
 9th Overall Critérium International
1st Stage 2
1992
 5th Overall Tour de France, Held  for 11 days
1993
 1st Stage 14 Tour de France
1994
 8th Overall Route du Sud
1995
 8th Chrono des Herbiers
1997
 2nd Circuit de la Sarthe
 2nd Cholet-Pays de Loire
 3rd Critérium International
 6th La Flèche Wallonne
 6th GP de la Ville de Rennes
 10th Overall Paris–Nice
1998
 1st Overall French Road Cycling Cup
 1st Paris–Camembert
 2nd Cholet-Pays de Loire
 3rd Route Adélie
 3rd Polymultipliée de l'Hautil
 5th Overall Tour du Limousin

Grand Tour general classification results timeline

References

External links 

1966 births
Living people
French male cyclists
Cyclists at the 1988 Summer Olympics
Olympic cyclists of France
French Tour de France stage winners
Sportspeople from Yvelines
French track cyclists
Cyclists from Île-de-France